Lennox Hastie is a chef in Sydney, Australia who owns the restaurant Firedoor and was featured on Netflix Chef's Table: BBQ which aired on September 2, 2020. Hastie is known for his unusual cooking techniques that use only fire without the use of electricity or gas.

Lennox is originally from England and was born to a Scottish mother and an Australian father. His maternal grandmother first introduced him to cooking and he started in a professional kitchen at the age of 15 at Gravetye Manor in Sussex, England. He studied at Westminster Catering College in London and then worked and studied at Le Gavroche. He then worked for four years at Le Manoir aux Quat'Saison before moving to the Maison des Bois in France. He moved from there to a pintxo bar in Spain and then to work with chef Victor (Bittor) Arguinzoniz at Asador Extebarri. He learned about fire-based cooking from Arguinzoniz.

He moved to Australia in 2011 to go out on his own and opened Firedoor in partnership with the Fink Group in 2015. It is the only restaurant in Australia where everything is fueled with only fire, without power or gas.

In 2017, he wrote the book Finding Fire: Cooking at its Most Elemental.

Awards 
Hastie won the 2020 Citi Chef of the Year Award and received the 17th place on the Australian Gourmet Traveller Top 100 restaurants list. In 2019 he was named the best chef in delicious.100: Australia's most delicious restaurant guide.

References 

Australian chefs
Australian television people
Australian television personalities
Year of birth missing (living people)
Living people